The National Farmers' Union (NFU) is a member organisation/industry association for farmers in England and Wales. It is the largest farmers' organisation in the countries, and has over 300 branch offices.

History
On 10 December 1908, a meeting was held in an ante-room at the Smithfield Show to discuss whether a national organisation should be formed to represent the interests of farmers. The outcome was the National Farmers' Union (NFU).

The first President, Colin Campbell, worked to get new branches off the ground, encourage membership and establish the NFU's credibility with Government, at a time when farming was going through the longest and deepest depression in its history, as imports of cheap grain and frozen meat flooded in from abroad.

At the 1918 general election, the union ran six candidates, none of whom were elected. In 1922, it sponsored three unsuccessful candidates under its own name, and four successful Conservative Party candidates.  It again sponsored Conservative candidates in 1923 and 1935, but has not done so since.

The NFU is registered as an association of employers under the 1974 Trade Union and Labour Relations Act. In 2000 it founded Assured Food Standards which administers the Red Tractor food quality mark.

The NFU elected its first female president, Minette Batters, in 2018.

Election results

1918 general election

Barnard was also sponsored by the National Party.

1922 general election

Blundell, Bruford, Lamb and Shepperson stood for the Conservative Party.

1923 general election

All candidates stood for the Conservative Party.

1924 general election

Both candidates stood for the Conservative Party.

1935 general election
Two candidates were sponsored and elected for the Conservative Party.

Function
The NFU proclaim themselves as 'The Voice of British Farming', the NFU states that it "champions British farming and provides professional representation and services to its Farmer and Grower members."   

It negotiates with the government and national organisations on behalf of English and Welsh member farmers.

Structure
The NFU is governed by its Constitution and Rules. Under the Constitution and Rules the NFU shall maintain a number of bodies, which are responsible for the Governance of the NFU. These include NFU Council, Governance Board, Policy Board, National Commodity Boards, Regional Commodity Boards, an Audit and Remuneration Committee and Legal Board and Regional Boards.

The NFU has an office in Brussels, Belgium to represent the interests of British farmers to the European Union.

The NFU is closely associated with the insurance mutual company NFU Mutual, which is also based in Warwickshire.

NFU Cymru is based at the Royal Welsh Showground in Builth Wells.

Archives
The archives of the NFU are deposited with the Rural History Centre at Reading University.

Arms

See also
 National Farmers' Union of Scotland
Farmers' Union of Wales
 Ulster Farmers Union

References

External links
 

Agricultural organisations based in England
Business organisations based in England
Organisations based in Warwickshire
Organizations established in 1908
Farmers' organizations
1908 establishments in England
Agricultural organisations based in Wales